Somerset, Pennsylvania may refer to:
 the borough of Somerset, Pennsylvania
 Somerset County, Pennsylvania
 Somerset Historical Center
 Somerset Township, Pennsylvania (disambiguation)